Millettia sacleuxii is a species of plant in the family Fabaceae. It is found only in Tanzania.

References

sacleuxii
Flora of Tanzania
Vulnerable plants
Taxonomy articles created by Polbot